Turn Me Up may refer to:

Turn Me Up!, a non-profit organization

Music
Turn Me Up, unreleased album by Katrina Elam

Songs
 "Turn Me Up", by Benassi Bros. from Pumphonia
"Turn Me Up", by Carly Rae Jepsen from Kiss
"Turn Me Up", by Cristal Snow 
"Turn Me Up", by Keith Barrow, 1979
"Turn Me Up", by Steady Mobb'n featuring Snoop Dogg from Black Mafia
"Turn Me Up", by Twin Shadow from Eclipse